Driving licence in Azerbaijan is a document affirming the right to oversee the pertinent categories of vehicles within the domain of the Republic of Azerbaijan. It is given to people who have come to the required minimum age, who have appropriate health condition, who know the rules of the road of the Azerbaijan Republic. This right can be restricted in case of termination of the driving license, breaking of traffic rules, the detection of illness or physical defects.

Content 
Irrespective of the type, on each driving license, there is distinctive mark of Azerbaijan Republic in international traffic - "AZ" and the following numbered data:
Surname of the bearer
Name and patronymic of the bearer;
Date and place of birth of the bearer;
Place of residence of the bearer;
Name of the issuing body;
Date and place of issue;
Expiry date of the license;
License number;
Official’s signature, stamp or seal of the issuing body;
Blood group and signature of the bearer;
Special remarks

Minimum age 
Depending on the type of vehicle the right for driving vehicles on Azerbaijani roads is allowed to:

Driving licence categories 
Since 2013 there are 7 categories that require a driving licence:

A: any type of motorbike
B: motorised vehicle under 3.5tons (optionally with light trailer)
C: motorised vehicle over 3.5tons (optionally with light trailer, up to 750kg)
D: bus (has more than 8 passenger seats) (optionally with light trailer, up to 750kg)
BE: motorised vehicle under 3.5tons with heavy trailer
CE: motorised vehicle over 3.5tons with heavy trailer
DE: bus with heavy trailer

The legal driving age within the Azerbaijan republic is 14 years for a bicycle or a cart, 16 for A1 category vehicles, 18 for A, B & C categories, 19 for BE category, 21 for CE and D categories and 24 for DE category. Military servants may get the right to drive “CE”, “D” and “DE” category vehicles from the age of 19 as specified by the legislation.

Gallery

See also 
 Azerbaijan identity card
 Azerbaijani passport
 Vehicle registration plates of Azerbaijan

References

External links 
State Traffic Police Department of the Republic of Azerbaijan

Azerbaijan